The Ìgbómìnà (also colloquially Igboona or Ogboona) are a subgroup of the Yoruba ethnic group, which originates from the north central and southwest Nigeria.
They speak a dialect also called Ìgbómìnà or Igbonna, classified among the Central Yoruba of the three major Yoruba dialectical areas. The Ìgbómìnà spread across what is now southern Kwara State and northern Osun State. Peripheral areas of the dialectical region have some similarities to the adjoining Ekiti, Ijesha and Oyo dialects.

Traditional trades and occupations

The Ìgbómìnà are renowned merchants well known for long distance trading which account for their wide spread across Yoruba land, they engage in other traditional occupation such as agriculture and hunting, as well as their woodcarving, leather art, and the famous Elewe masquerade.  It is an Egungun representing the ancestors during special festivals.

Geographical spread
Traditional Ìgbómìnàland consist of Four local government areas (LGAs) of Kwara State: Irepodun, Ifelodun, Ilorin East and Isin LGAs, as well as two local government areas of Osun State: Ifedayo and Ila LGAs.
The major Ìgbómìnà cities in Osun State are  Oke-Ila Orangun, Ora, and Ila Orangun, while the major Ìgbómìnà cities in Kwara State which has most of the Ìgbómìnà land and population include: Omu-Aran, Òbà, Ajasse Ipo, Eleju of Eju-land, Eku-Mesesan-Oro (Ijomu-Oro, Iddo-Oro, Okerimi-Oro, Afin-Oro, Okeola-Oro, Ibode-Oro, Oro, Iludun-0ro, Agbeola-Oro),Agbamu, Edidi (Edidi-ona, Edidi Idera, Edidi Oja), Oke-Onigbin, Isanlu Isin, Ijara-Isin, Aran-Orin, Rore, Esiẹ, Omupo, Omido, Ipetu-Igbomina, Igbaja, Ora, Oke-Ode, Owu-Isin, Oro-Ago, Ahun, Arandun, Shaare, Oke-Aba. The villages in Igbomina Ile-Ire are: Owa Onire, Owa Kajola, Owode Ofaro, Idoba Araromi(this Community has two lands, the ancestral lands, one at Idoba at Orioke near Owa and the present settlement near Owode Ofaro), Ikosin (Ile Ire District Headquarters where the popular ancient Igbo Ejimogun market was located),  Oke-Oyan, Idera, Afin, Alaabe, Obinn or Obinrin Aiyetoro, Oreke Oke, Okeigbo, Babanla. Other Igboimna towns are in Idofian districts,  Okanle, Fajeromi, Odo-eku, Oko, Ola, Idofin, Iwo, Agbonda, Agbeku, Olayinka, Alakuko-Irorun, Edidi, Ijan-Otun, Agbele, Omido, Okeya, Babanlomo, Agbamu, Ijan, Pamo-Isin, Egii-Owu, Owa-Onire, Durosoto, Koko-Afin, Maloko, Olomi Oja, Omirinrin, Faje, Ajengbe, Alasoro, Eyin Afo, Idofin Igbana, Idofin Aga, Ekudu, Manasara, Oko Adigun, Kudu-Isin, Oke oyi, Alegongo, Sabaja, Oponda, Oree, Agunjin, Apado, Eleyin, and Yaru.

Ìgbómìnàland is adjoined on the west and northwest by major neighbours such as the Oyo-Yoruba region, on the south and southwest by the Ijesha-Yoruba region, on the south and southeast by the Ekiti-Yoruba region, on the east by the Yagba-Yoruba region, and on the north by the non-Yoruba Nupe region south of the Niger River. Other minor neighbours of the Ìgbómìnà are the Ibolo sub-group of the cities of Offa, Oyun and Okuku in the west.

Archaeological chronology and ancient history
Over 800 carved stones, mostly representing human figures, have been found around Esie in western Igbomina, Iji-Isin, Ijara and Ofaro villages. It is yet to be known by the entire world who created the sculptures, but they appear to have been created around 1100 AD.

Archaeological and linguistic evidence suggest that the Ìgbómìnà people may have predated the surrounding peoples except perhaps the Nupe and the Yagba. Ìgbómìnàland definitely predated the Oduduwa era as evidenced by oral traditions of royal and non-royal migrations from Oduduwa’s Ile-Ife which met existing dynasties in place but displaced, subsumed or subjugated them. It appears that aside from more recent conflicts in the last two centuries, the Oyo, Ijesha, and the Ekiti may have in more ancient times, pressured the Ìgbómìnà, captured territory in the plains and restricted them into the more rugged and lower-quality land of the Yoruba hills. The Ìgbómìnà, on the other hand, appear to have pressured the Nupe and the Yagba and taken territory away from them in places, but also losing territory to them in other places.
	
Major upheavals, conflicts and wars as well as epidemics have resulted in major ancient dispersals and migrations such as the Òbà diasporas documented in the oral history, oral poetry and lineage praise songs of several Ìgbómìnà clans. Some of the towns in Igbomina are known for historical events or things, an example is the Gegele hill in igbaja.

Recent history

The Ilorin Provincial Gazetteer (1918) dates the settlement of Igbaja, one of the Igbomina towns, as late 17th or early 18th century, while the Igbaja District Gazetteer (1933–35) puts it about 1750 AD.
By 1800, the Alafin (supreme ruler of Yoruba) had consolidated his power over the Igbomina and placed an Ajele (Governor) in Ilorin to safeguard his interests. 
The Sudan Interior Mission came to Oro Ago in 1911, to Agunjin before 1918, and to Oke Oyan, Igbaja, and Oke Aba in the 1920s. Starting in the 1930s, primary and secondary schools were established, resulting in changes to the traditional ways of life.

References

Yoruba subgroups